Battulgyn Temüülen (born 10 July 1989) is a Mongolian judoka. He competed at the 2016 Summer Olympics in the men's +100 kg event, in which he was eliminated in the first round by Mohamed-Amine Tayeb. He was the flag  bearer for Mongolia at the Parade of Nations.

References

External links
 
 
 

1989 births
Living people
Mongolian male judoka
Olympic judoka of Mongolia
Judoka at the 2016 Summer Olympics
20th-century Mongolian people
21st-century Mongolian people